Cycnoderus is a genus of beetles in the family Cerambycidae, containing the following species:

 Cycnoderus brevicolle Giesbert & Chemsak, 1993
 Cycnoderus chlorizans Chevrolat, 1859
 Cycnoderus copei Giesbert & Chemsak, 1993
 Cycnoderus expeditus Chevrolat, 1859
 Cycnoderus guatemalicus Giesbert & Chemsak, 1993
 Cycnoderus intincta (Pascoe, 1866)
 Cycnoderus lividus Giesbert & Chemsak, 1993
 Cycnoderus moestulus (Pascoe, 1866)
 Cycnoderus rufithorax Gounelle, 1911
 Cycnoderus tenuatus Audinet-Serville, 1834
 Cycnoderus virginiae Giesbert & Chemsak, 1993
 Cycnoderus barbatus Gounelle, 1911
 Cycnoderus dispar Gounelle, 1911

References

Rhopalophorini